Carol Jean Fox (born July 11, 1956 in Ypsilanti, Michigan) is an American figure skater. She competed in ice dance with Richard Dalley at the 1984 Winter Olympics.
Prior to ice dancing, Carol and her partner Richard Dalley were competitive roller figure skaters and competed out of the Riverside Skating Club in Livonia, Michigan..

Results
(with Richard Dalley)

References

1956 births
Living people
American female ice dancers
Olympic figure skaters of the United States
Figure skaters at the 1984 Winter Olympics
Sportspeople from Ypsilanti, Michigan
21st-century American women